Sigrid Lang (born 4 November 1963) is a German sports shooter. She competed in the women's 50 metre rifle three positions event at the 1984 Summer Olympics.

References

1963 births
Living people
German female sport shooters
Olympic shooters of West Germany
Shooters at the 1984 Summer Olympics
Place of birth missing (living people)